Diptychophora muscella is a moth in the family Crambidae. It was described by John Fryer in 1912. It is found on the Seychelles, where it has been recorded from Mahé and Silhouette.

References

Diptychophorini
Moths described in 1912